Mbo is located in the South Eastern part of Nigeria and is a Local Government Area in Akwa Ibom State. Following the local government creation exercise of the federal government in 1989 Mbo Local Government Area was carved out of Oron Division same year.

History

Mbo is bounded in the North axis by Urue-Offong/Oruko Local Government Area, in the South axis by Atlantic Ocean and Cameroon , in the East by Udung Uko Local Government Area and in the West by Esit Eket and Ibeno Local Government Areas.

Mbo LGA is one of the five Oron people Local Government in Akwa Ibom State. The local government is made up of clans (where some are now known as district) which are Afaha Okpo Clan, Effiat, Afaha Ukwong (now known as Nkwong District), Ibiaku, Ikpo Ikono, Ikpa Ibom, Atanuk and Ekpuk.

Language
The people generally speak Oro language with minor dialectical differences, with strong cultural affinity among the people. The Oro language is popularly spoken by the people of Mbo Local Government Area followed by the Efik language with Ebughu language, Efai language and Enwang-Uda language.

Clan/District And Settlement
Mbo is divided into six district which includes.

Afaha Okpo Clan or District consist of Eleven (11) Oro language speaking villages and towns which includes.

Ekiebong
Eyo Efai
Eyo Ukut
Ibete
Ibuet Ikot
Uba, Ubotong
Udini
Udombo
Udung Eyo
Adaeba
Uko Akpan

Effiat Clan or Distrist consist of sixteen Efai language, Efik language and Oro language speaking villages and towns. They include

Akpa Nkanua
Akwa Obio Effiat
Asiok Obufa
Esuk Anwang
Ibuot Utan
Ine Inua Abasi
Inua Abasi
Mbe Ndoro
Obio Iyata
Obong Nim
Usuk Effiat
Utan Antai
Utan Brama
Utang Efiong

Afaha Ukwong Clan Or Nkwong District consist of fourteen (14) towns and villages which speaks the oro language, Uda language and Efik language they include

Akai Ati
Akai owu
Akprang
Eprang Udo
Ibaka Town (Uda)
Isong Inyang
Kprang (Uda)
Mkpang Utong
Offi (Uda)
Onukim (Uda)
Osu Udesi
Udung Eyo Unyenge
Uke Nteghe
Utit Atai Unyenge.
Utan Udombo

Ibiaku Clan or District is an Efik settlement which includes

Esa Ekpo
Ibekwe-Akpan Nya
Ibiaku Esa Ekpo
Ikot Abasi Akpan
Ikot Abia Enin
Ikot Aka
Ikot Ata/Nung Ikono
Ikot Ekpenyong
Ikot Idiong
Ikot Itina Mbo
Ikot Ntot
Ikot-Akpabong
Ikot-Ebak
Minya Ntak
Ndot/Abat Nya
Nya Odiong

Ikpo Ikono District includes fifteen (15) Efik settlement which includes

Asana Mbo
Ekpuk
Ibianga
Iffe
Ikot Abia-Utok
Ikot Afang
Ikot Eda
Ikot Ekpaw
Ikot Enyienge
Ikot Esen Akpan Ntuen
Ikot Mkpeye
Ikot Obio-Nso
Ikot Umiang
Ikot Unya Iton

Ikpa Ibom District which includes Twenty Eight (28) villages and towns which are

Atanuk
Ekim
Ibiotio
Ikot Aba
Ikot Akata Mbo
Ikot Akpa-Ekop Mbo
Ikot Akpabio Ukam
Ikot Akpaden
Ikot Akpan Ukam
Ikot Ayan
Ikot Edim
Ikot Edong Ukam
Ikot Ekong
Ikot Ekpang
Ikot Enin
Ikot Etefia Ukam
Ikot Eto
Ikot Iseghe
Ikot Obio Ekpong
Ikot Obio Ndoho
Ikot Obio-Akai
Ikot Okop – Odong
Ikot Oyoro
Ikot Ukwa
Ikotn Inyang-Okop
Ndom Gbodom
Ndom Ibotio
Obioete

Commerce and People
Mbo is made up of friendly and busy people with greater influxes of non indigene and their occupation is Marine-based, comprising fishing, marine transportation and subsistent farming. Fishing is an important economic activity in Mbo LGA with the area’s rivers and tributaries being is rich in seafood. The LGA is also blessed with fertile soil and is a hub for the cultivation of a number of crops such as plantain, vegetables, cassava and a variety of fruits. Other important economic engagements undertaken by the people of Mbo LGA include trade, crafts making, and the construction of canoes and fishing nets.

Geography
Mbo LGA covers a total area of 365 square kilometres and has an average temperature of 25°C. The LGA consists of large forest reserves and has an average humidity level of 80%. Mbo LGA hosts several rivers and streams with an average wind speed of 11 km/h.

Natural Resources
Natural Resorces in Mbo includes Forest resources such as timber, vegetables and fruits
Mineral deposits such as clay, fine sand, salt, gravel and crude oil which is found onshore and offshore is also available in large quantity.

Prominent People
Late Chief Etim O.Inyang - Former Inspector General of Police. He was from Enwang in Mbo LGA

See also
 Oron people
 Urue-Offong/Oruko
 Oron, Akwa Ibom
 Okobo, Akwa Ibom
 Udung Uko
 Obolo
 Akwa Ibom State
 Efik

References 

Local Government Areas in Akwa Ibom State
Populated coastal places in Nigeria
Oron people
Places in Oron Nation